The Marquardt RJ43-MA were ramjet engines used on the CIM-10 Bomarc missile, the D-21 drone, and the AQM-60.  They were engineered and built by the Marquardt Corporation.

Thrust:
Marquardt RJ43-MA-3 ramjet; 51 kN (11500 lb)
Marquardt RJ43-MA-7 ramjet; 53 kN (12000 lb)
Marquardt RJ43-MA-11 ramjet; 53 kN (12000 lb)
Marquardt RJ43-MA-20S4 ramjet; 7.3 kN (1,500 lb @ 95,000 ft.)

Thrust/weight ratio: ~40

References

Ramjet engines